Monette Moore (May 19, 1902 in Gainesville, Texas – October 21, 1962 in Garden Grove, California) was an American jazz and classic female blues singer.

Moore was raised in Kansas City, Missouri. She taught herself to play the piano in her teens and worked as a theater pianist in Kansas City in the early 1920s. In 1923 and 1924 she recorded for Paramount Records in Chicago and New York City, relocating to the latter city. In the 1920s she worked in Chicago, Dallas and Oklahoma City. She sang with Charlie Johnson's ensemble at Smalls Paradise and recorded with him in 1927 and 1928. She recorded 44 songs from 1923 to 1927, some under the name Susie Smith. Her sidemen included Tommy Ladnier, Jimmy O'Bryant, Jimmy Blythe, Bob Fuller, Rex Stewart, Bubber Miley, and Elmer Snowden. From 1924-1941 she worked in theaters and clubs in New York. She appeared with Lucky Millinder at the Lafayette Theater in 1931.

In the 1930s, Moore recorded with Fats Waller (1932), filled in for Ethel Waters as an understudy, and sang with Zinky Cohn in Chicago in 1937. She performed at her own club, Monette's Place, in New York City in 1933. Around 1940 she sang in New York with Sidney Bechet and Sammy Price. She moved to Los Angeles in 1942, where she performed often in nightclubs. She appeared in James P. Johnson's revue Sugar Hill (about 1949) and played minor roles in numerous films including Yes Sir, Mr. Bones (1951) and The Outsider.  Moore recorded again from 1945 to 1947.

She made a brief cameo appearance in the 1954 remake of A Star is Born, starring Judy Garland. Moore sang a brief refrain in the song and dance number, "Lose That Long Face," which was edited out of the film before it was released.  This extended version of the song has been reconstructed, and can be seen on YouTube. In Los Angeles in the 1950s, she continued to perform in local venues, but also worked as a maid and restroom attendant.  She played with the Young Men of New Orleans at Disneyland in 1961–1962.

Moore died of emphysema in October 1962.

Filmography

Notes

References
Harris, Sheldon (1994). Blues Who's Who (rev. ed.). New York: Da Capo Press. .
Yanow, Scott. [ Monette Moore] at AllMusic.
Yanow, Scott (2001). Classic Jazz: The Musicians & Recordings that Shaped Jazz, 1895–1933. Hal Leonard. .

1902 births
1962 deaths
American jazz singers
American blues singers
Classic female blues singers
Singers from Texas
Vocalion Records artists
Ajax Records artists
Paramount Records artists
20th-century American singers
Restroom attendants
20th-century American women singers
Jazz musicians from Texas
Deaths from emphysema